Vice Admiral Tarun Sobti, AVSM, VSM is a serving Flag officer in the Indian Navy. He currently serves as the Director General Project Seabird. He last served as the Flag Officer Commanding Eastern Fleet. He earlier served as the Deputy Commandant and Chief Instructor at the Indian Naval Academy from March 2019 to January 2021.

Early life and education
Sobti was born in an army family. His father was a general officer in the Indian Army, retiring as a Major General. His mother was a teacher and his elder brother also joined the Army, retiring in 2017.

Sobti attended the Delhi Public School, Mathura Road. After his schooling, he joined and graduated from the National Defence Academy, Pune in 1986. He was awarded the President's Gold Medal, for standing first in overall order of merit.

Naval career 
Sobti was commissioned into the Indian Navy on 1 July 1988. He is a specialist in Navigation and direction. During the specialisation course, he stood first and was adjudged the Best all-round trainee. He attended the Collège Interarmées de Défense in Paris and the College of Naval Warfare (CNW) in Mumbai. During the Naval Higher Command Course at the CNW, he was awarded the CNS Gold Medal for Best Op Paper.

He has served as the navigating officer of the Khukri-class corvette  and was part of the commissioning crew of the Delhi-class Guided missile destroyer  as its navigating officer. He later served as the direction officer of the aircraft carrier  and the executive officer of the guided missile destroyer .

Sobti has commanded the Veer-class missile vessel , and the lead ship of the Kora-class corvette . In August 2014, the lead ship of the indigenously-built Kolkata-class Guided missile destroyers  was commissioned by the Prime Minister Narendra Modi in Mumbai. Sobti was the commissioning Commanding Officer of the ship.

Sobti, in his staff appointments, has served as the Joint Director of Staff Requirements and Joint Director of Personnel at Naval headquarters. He also served as the Captain Work-Up at Local Work-Up Team (East). The LWT (East) is under the operational control of Flag Officer Sea Training and administrative control of the Flag Officer Commanding-in-Chief Eastern Naval Command. As a Commodore, he served as the Naval attaché at the Embassy of India in Moscow.

Flag rank
On promotion to Flag Rank, in March 2019, Sobti took over as the Deputy Commandant and Chief Instructor at the Indian Naval Academy, Ezhimala. After a 21 month stint as Deputy Commandant, he handed over to Rear Admiral A. N. Pramod in January 2021. For this stint, Sobti was awarded the Vishisht Seva Medal on 26 January 2020.
On 23 February 2021, he assumed the office of the Flag Officer Commanding Eastern Fleet, taking over from Rear Admiral Sanjay Vatsayan who commanded the fleet from 2020 to 2021.

Under his command, the Eastern Fleet, executed Operation Samudra Setu II and Operation Sagar. These operations were aimed at the transfer of medical oxygen and provided humanitarian assistance to friendly foreign countries respectively. The fleet also participated in the maritime exercise Malabar 21 in Western Pacific off Guam. For his command of the Eastern fleet, he was awarded the Ati Vishisht Seva Medal on 26 January 2022.

On promotion to the rank of Vice Admiral, Sobti was appointed as the Director General, Project Seabird.

Awards and decorations

Personal life
Sobti is married to Shagun Sobti, a teacher. The couple have a daughter, Mallika.

See also
 Flag Officer Commanding Eastern Fleet
 Eastern Fleet

References

Bibliography
 

Indian Navy admirals
Flag Officers Commanding Eastern Fleet
National Defence Academy (India) alumni
Living people
Year of birth missing (living people)
Recipients of the Ati Vishisht Seva Medal
Recipients of the Vishisht Seva Medal
Indian naval attachés